Mount Fonda is a mountain,  high, in the northwest part of the Swanson Mountains,  south of Greegor Peak, in the Ford Ranges of Marie Byrd Land, Antarctica. It was mapped by the United States Antarctic Service (1939–41) under Rear Admiral Richard E. Byrd, and was named for Howard B. Fonda who contributed medical supplies to the Byrd Antarctic Expeditions of 1928–30 and 1933–35.

References 

Mountains of Marie Byrd Land